The Gardeners Dictionary was a widely cited reference series, written by Philip Miller (1691–1771), which tended to focus on plants cultivated in England. Eight editions of the series were published in his lifetime. After his death, it was further developed by George Don as A general system of gardening and botany. Founded upon Miller's Gardener's dictionary, and arranged according to the natural system (1831–1838).

Editions

References

External links
 Various scans at The Internet Archive

Gardening books
Dictionaries by subject